Miss Ciudad de México is a beauty pageant held in Mexico City, Mexico, that selects that state's representative for the national Miss Mexico Organization pageant. The state organization has not had a national winner.

Title holders
Below are the names of the annual titleholders of Miss Ciudad de México and their final placements in the Miss Mexico Organization.

Color key

References

Beauty pageants in Mexico
Events in Mexico City